Haïm Brezis  (born 1 June 1944) is a French mathematician, who mainly works in functional analysis and partial differential equations.

Biography
Born in Riom-ès-Montagnes, Cantal, France. Brezis is the son of a Romanian immigrant father, who came to France in the 1930s, and a Jewish mother who fled from the Netherlands. His wife, Michal Govrin, a native Israeli, works as a novelist, poet, and theater director. Brezis received his Ph.D. from the University of Paris in 1972 under the supervision of Gustave Choquet. He is currently a professor at the Pierre and Marie Curie University and a visiting distinguished professor at Rutgers University. He is a member of the Academia Europaea (1988) and a foreign associate of the United States National Academy of Sciences (2003). In 2012 he became a fellow of the American Mathematical Society. He holds honorary doctorates from several universities including National Technical University of Athens. Brezis is listed as an ISI highly cited researcher. He also served on the Mathematical Sciences jury for the Infosys Prize in 2013 and 2014.

Works
Opérateurs maximaux monotones et semi-groupes de contractions dans les espaces de Hilbert (1973)
Analyse Fonctionnelle. Théorie et Applications (1983)
 Haïm Brezis. Un mathématicien juif. Entretien Avec Jacques Vauthier. Collection Scientifiques & Croyants. Editions Beauchesne, 1999. , 
 Functional Analysis, Sobolev Spaces and Partial Differential Equations, Springer; 1st Edition. edition (November 10, 2010),

See also
Bony–Brezis theorem
Brezis–Gallouet inequality
Brezis–Lieb lemma

References

External links
Biographical sketch (in French)
List of publications on the website of Rutgers University

1944 births
Living people
Jewish French scientists
People from Cantal
20th-century French mathematicians
Mathematical analysts
University of Paris alumni
Academic staff of the University of Paris
Fellows of the American Mathematical Society
Members of Academia Europaea
Members of the French Academy of Sciences
Foreign associates of the National Academy of Sciences
French people of Romanian descent
20th-century French Jews
French Orthodox Jews
PDE theorists
Functional analysts